Ukrainians are an East Slavic ethnic group native to Ukraine. The native language of the Ukrainians is Ukrainian. The majority of Ukrainians are Eastern Orthodox Christians.

While under the Polish–Lithuanian Commonwealth, the Austrian Empire, and then Austria-Hungary, the East Slavic population who lived in the territories of modern-day Ukraine were historically known as Ruthenians, referring to the territory of Ruthenia, and to distinguish them with the Ukrainians living under the Russian Empire, who were known as Little Russians, named after the territory of Little Russia. Cossack heritage is especially emphasized, for example in the Ukrainian national anthem.

Ethnonym

The ethnonym Ukrainians came into wide use only in the 20th century after the territory of Ukraine obtained distinctive statehood in 1917. From the 14th to the 16th centuries the western portions of the European part of what is now known as Russia, plus the territories of northern Ukraine and Belarus (Western Rus) were largely known as Rus, continuing the tradition of Kievan Rus. People of these territories were usually called Rus or Rusyns (known as Ruthenians in Western and Central Europe). The period of Old Ukrainian (mid-11th to late 14th century) dates from the same time as the oldest extant Rus' texts and coincides with the rise and fall of Kievan Rus'.

The Ukrainian language is, like modern Russian and Belarusian, a descendent of Old East Slavic. In Western and Central Europe it was known by the exonym "Ruthenian". In the 16th and 17th centuries, with the establishment of the Zaporizhian Sich, names of Ukraine and Ukrainian began to be used in Sloboda Ukraine. After the decline of the Zaporizhian Sich and the establishment of Imperial Russian hegemony in Left Bank Ukraine, Ukrainians became more widely known by Russians as "Little Russians" (Malorossy), with the majority of Ukrainian élites espousing Little Russian identity and adopting the Russian language (as Ukrainian was outlawed in almost all contexts). This exonym (regarded now as a humiliating imperialist imposition) did not spread widely among the peasantry which constituted the majority of the population. Ukrainian peasants still referred to their country as "Ukraine" (a name associated with the Zaporizhian Sich, with the Hetmanate and with their struggle against Poles, Russians, Turks and Crimean Tatars) and to themselves and their language as Ruthenians/Ruthenian.

With the publication of Ivan Kotliarevsky's Eneyida (Aeneid) in 1798, which established the modern Ukrainian language, and with the subsequent Romantic revival of national traditions and culture, the ethnonym Ukrainians and the notion of a Ukrainian language came into more prominence at the beginning of the 19th century and gradually replaced the words "Rusyns" and "Ruthenian(s)". In areas outside the control of the Russian/Soviet state until the mid-20th century (Western Ukraine), Ukrainians were known by their pre-existing names for much longer. The appellation Ukrainians initially came into common usage in Central Ukraine and did not take hold in Galicia and Bukovina until the latter part of the 19th century, in Transcarpathia until the 1930s, and in the Prešov Region until the late 1940s.

The modern name Ukraintsi (Ukrainians) derives from Ukraina (Ukraine), a name first documented in 1187. Several scientific theories attempt to explain the etymology of the term. According to the traditional theory, it derives from the Proto-Slavic root *kraj-, which has two meanings, one meaning the homeland as in "nash rodnoi kraj" (our homeland), and the other "edge, border", and originally had the sense of "periphery", "borderland" or "frontier region". According to another theory, the term ukraina should be distinguished from the term okraina: whereas the latter term means "borderland", the former one has the meaning of "cut-off piece of land", thus acquiring the connotation of "our land", "land allotted to us".

In the last three centuries the population of Ukraine experienced periods of Polonization and Russification, but preserved a common culture and a sense of common identity.

Geographic distribution

Most ethnic Ukrainians live in Ukraine, where they make up over three-quarters of the population. The largest population of Ukrainians outside of Ukraine lives in Russia where about 1.9 million Russian citizens identify as Ukrainian, while millions of others (primarily in southern Russia and Siberia) have some Ukrainian ancestry. The inhabitants of the Kuban, for example, have vacillated among three identities: Ukrainian, Russian (an identity supported by the Soviet regime), and "Cossack". Approximately 800,000 people of Ukrainian ancestry live in the Russian Far East in an area known historically as "Green Ukraine".

In a 2011 national poll of Ukraine, 49% of Ukrainians said they had relatives living in Russia.

According to some previous assumptions, an estimated number of almost 2.4 million people of Ukrainian origin live in North America (1,359,655 in Canada and 1,028,492 in the United States). Large numbers of Ukrainians live in Brazil (600,000), Kazakhstan (338,022), Moldova (325,235), Argentina (305,000), (Germany) (272,000), Italy (234,354), Belarus (225,734), Uzbekistan (124,602), the Czech Republic (110,245), Spain (90,530–100,000) and Romania (51,703–200,000). There are also large Ukrainian communities in such countries as Latvia, Portugal, France, Australia, Paraguay, the UK, Israel, Slovakia, Kyrgyzstan, Austria, Uruguay and the former Yugoslavia. Generally, the Ukrainian diaspora is present in more than one hundred and twenty countries of the world.

The number of Ukrainians in Poland amounted to some 51,000 people in 2011 (according to the Polish Census). Since 2014, the country has experienced a large increase in immigration from Ukraine. More recent data put the number of Ukrainian migrant workers at 1.2 – 1.3 million in 2016.

In the last decades of the 19th century, many Ukrainians were forced by the Tsarist autocracy to move to the Asian regions of Russia, while many of their counterpart Slavs under Austro-Hungarian rule emigrated to the New World seeking work and better economic opportunities. Today, large ethnic Ukrainian minorities reside in Russia, Canada, the United States, Brazil, Kazakhstan, Italy and Argentina. According to some sources, around 20 million people outside Ukraine identify as having Ukrainian ethnicity, however the official data of the respective countries calculated together doesn't show more than 10 million. Ukrainians have one of the largest diasporas in the world.

Origin

The East Slavs emerged from the undifferentiated early Slavs in the Slavic migrations of the 6th and 7th centuries CE. The state of Kievan Rus united the East Slavs during the 9th to 13th centuries. East Slavic tribes cited as "proto-Ukrainian" include the Volhynians, Derevlianians, Polianians, and Siverianians and the less significant Ulychians, Tivertsians, and White Croats.
The Gothic historian Jordanes and 6th-century Byzantine authors named two groups that lived in the south-east of Europe: Sclavins (western Slavs) and Antes. Polianians are identified as the founders of the city of Kyiv and as playing the key role in the formation of the Kievan Rus state. At the beginning of the 9th century, Varangians used the waterways of Eastern Europe for military raids and trade, particularly the trade route from the Varangians to the Greeks. Until the 11th century these Varangians also served as key mercenary troops for a number of princes in medieval Kyiv, as well as for some of the Byzantine emperors, while others occupied key administrative positions in Kievan Rus society, and eventually became slavicized. Besides other cultural traces, several Ukrainian names show traces of Norse origins as a result of influences from that period.

Differentiation between separate East Slavic groups began to emerge in the later medieval period, and an East Slavic dialect continuum developed within the Polish–Lithuanian Commonwealth, with the Ruthenian language emerging as a written standard. The active development of a concept of a Ukrainian nation and a Ukrainian language began with the Ukrainian National Revival in the early 19th century. In the Soviet era (1917–1991), official historiography emphasized "the cultural unity of 'proto-Ukrainians' and 'proto-Russians' in the fifth and sixth centuries".

Genetics and genomics

In a survey of 97 genomes for diversity in full genome sequences among self-identified Ukrainians from Ukraine, a study identified more than 13 million genetic variants, representing about a quarter of the total genetic diversity discovered in Europe.  Among these nearly 500,000 are previously undocumented and likely to be unique for this population. Medically relevant mutations whose prevalence in the Ukrainian genomes differed significantly compared to other European genome sequences, particularly from Western Europe and Russia. Ukrainian genomes form a single cluster positioned between the Northern on one side, and Western European populations on the other. There was a significant overlap with Central European populations as well as with people from the Balkans.  In addition to the close geographic distance between these populations, this may also reflect the insufficient representation of samples from the surrounding populations.

The Ukrainian gene-pool includes the following Y-haplogroups, in order from the most prevalent:

 R1a (43%)
 I2a (23%)
 R1b (8%)
 E1b1b (7%)
 I1 (5%)
 N1 (5%)
 J2 (4%)
 G (3%)
 T (1%)

Roughly all R1a Ukrainians carry R1a-Z282; R1a-Z282 has been found significantly only in Eastern Europe. Chernivtsi Oblast is the only region in Ukraine where Haplogroup I2a occurs more frequently than R1a, much less frequent even in Ivano-Frankivsk Oblast. In comparison to their northern and eastern neighbors, Ukrainians have a similar percentage of  Haplogroup R1a-Z280 (43%) in their population—compare Belarusians, Russians, and Lithuanians and (55%, 46%, and 42% respectively). Populations in Eastern Europe which have never been Slavic do as well. Ukrainians in Chernivtsi Oblast (near the Romanian border) have a higher percentage of I2a as opposed to R1a, which is typical of the Balkan region, but a smaller percentage than Russians of the N1c1 lineage found among Finnic, Baltic, and Siberian populations, and also less R1b than West Slavs.
In terms of haplogroup distribution, the genetic pattern of Ukrainians most closely resembles that of Belarusians. The presence of the N1c lineage is explained by a contribution of the assimilated Finnic tribes.

Related ethnic groups

Within Ukraine and adjacent areas, there are several other distinct ethnic sub-groups, especially in western Ukraine: places like Zakarpattia and Halychyna. Among them the most known are Hutsuls, Volhynians, Boykos and Lemkos (otherwise known as Carpatho-Rusyns – a derivative of Carpathian Ruthenians), each with particular areas of settlement, dialect, dress, anthropological type, and folk traditions.

History

Early history

Ukraine has had a very turbulent history, a fact explained by its geographical position. In the 9th century the Varangians from Scandinavia conquered the proto-Slavic tribes on the territory of today's Ukraine, Belarus, and western Russia and laid the groundwork for the Kyivan Rus state. The ancestors of the Ukrainian nation such as Polianians had an important role in the development and culturalization of Kyivan Rus state. The internecine wars between Rus princes, which began after the death of Yaroslav the Wise, led to the political fragmentation of the state into a number of principalities. The quarreling between the princes left Kyivan Rus vulnerable to foreign attacks, and the invasion of the Mongols in 1236. and 1240. finally destroyed the state. Another important state in the history of the Ukrainians is Kingdom of Ruthenia (1199–1349).

The third important state for Ukrainians is Cossack Hetmanate. The Cossacks of Zaporizhia since the late 15th century controlled the lower bends of the river Dnieper, between Russia, Poland and the Tatars of Crimea, with the fortified capital, Zaporizhian Sich. Hetman Bohdan Khmelnytsky is one of the most celebrated and at the same time most controversial political figures in Ukraine's early-modern history. A brilliant military leader, his greatest achievement in the process of national revolution was the formation of the Cossack Hetmanate state of the Zaporozhian Host (1648–1782). The period of the Ruin in the late 17th century in the history of Ukraine is characterized by the disintegration of Ukrainian statehood and general decline. During the Ruin Ukraine became divided along the Dnieper River into Left-Bank Ukraine and Right-Bank Ukraine, and the two-halves became hostile to each other. Ukrainian leaders during the period are considered to have been largely opportunists and men of little vision who could not muster broad popular support for their policies. There were roughly 4 million Ukrainians at the end of the 17th century.

At the final stages of the First World War, a powerful struggle for an independent Ukrainian state developed in the central Ukrainian territories, which, until 1917, were part of the Russian Empire. The newly established Ukrainian government, the Central Rada, headed by Mykhailo Hrushevsky, issued four universals, the Fourth of which, dated 22 January 1918, declared the independence and sovereignty of the Ukrainian National Republic (UNR) on 25 January 1918. The session of the Central Rada on 29 April 1918 ratified the Constitution of the UNR and elected Hrushevsky president.

Soviet period

During the 1920s, under the Ukrainisation policy pursued by the national Communist leadership of Mykola Skrypnyk, Soviet leadership encouraged a national renaissance in the Ukrainian culture and language. Ukrainisation was part of the Soviet-wide policy of Korenisation (literally indigenisation).

During 1932–1933, millions of Ukrainians were starved to death by the Soviet regime which led to a famine, known as the Holodomor. The Soviet regime remained silent about the Holodomor and provided no aid to the victims or the survivors. But news and information about what was going on reached the West and evoked public responses in Polish-ruled Western Ukraine and in the Ukrainian diaspora. Since the 1990s the independent Ukrainian state, particularly under President Viktor Yushchenko, the Ukrainian mass media and academic institutions, many foreign governments, most Ukrainian scholars, and many foreign scholars have viewed and written about the Holodomor as genocide and issued official declarations and publications to that effect. Modern scholarly estimates of the direct loss of human life due to the famine range between 2.6 million (3–3.5 million) and 12 million although much higher numbers are usually published in the media and cited in political debates. As of March 2008, the parliament of Ukraine and the governments of several countries, including the United States have recognized the Holodomor as an act of genocide.

Following the Invasion of Poland in September 1939, German and Soviet troops divided the territory of Poland. Thus, Eastern Galicia and Volhynia with their Ukrainian population became part of Soviet Ukraine. When the German armies invaded the Soviet Union on 22 June 1941, those regions temporarily became part of the Nazi-controlled Reichskommissariat Ukraine. In total, the number of ethnic Ukrainians who fought in the ranks of the Soviet Army is estimated from 4.5 million to 7 million. The pro-Soviet partisan guerrilla resistance in Ukraine is estimated to number at 47,800 from the start of occupation to 500,000 at its peak in 1944, with about 50% being ethnic Ukrainians. Of the estimated 8.6 million Soviet troop losses, 1.4 million were ethnic Ukrainians.

Historical maps of Ukraine
The Ukrainian state has occupied a number of territories since its initial foundation. Most of these territories have been located within Eastern Europe, however, as depicted in the maps in the gallery below, has also at times extended well into Eurasia and South-Eastern Europe. At times there has also been a distinct lack of a Ukrainian state, as its territories were on a number of occasions, annexed by its more powerful neighbours.

Ethnic/national identity

The watershed period in the development of modern Ukrainian national consciousness was the struggle for independence during the creation of the Ukrainian People's Republic from 1917 to 1921. A concerted effort to reverse the growth of Ukrainian national consciousness was begun by the regime of Joseph Stalin in the late 1920s, and continued with minor interruptions until the most recent times. The man-made Famine of 1932–33, the deportations of the so-called kulaks, the physical annihilation of the nationally conscious intelligentsia, and terror in general were used to destroy and subdue the Ukrainian nation. Even after Joseph Stalin's death the concept of a Russified though multiethnic Soviet people was officially promoted, according to which the non-Russian nations were relegated to second-class status. Despite this, many Ukrainians played prominent roles in the Soviet Union, including such public figures as Semen Tymoshenko.

The creation of a sovereign and independent Ukraine in 1991, however, pointed to the failure of the policy of the "merging of nations" and to the enduring strength of the Ukrainian national consciousness. Today, one of the consequences of these acts is Ukrainophobia.

Biculturalism is especially present in southeastern Ukraine where there is a significant Russian minority. Historical colonization of Ukraine is one reason that creates confusion about national identity to this day. Many citizens of Ukraine have adopted the Ukrainian national identity in the past 20 years. According to the concept of nationality dominant in Eastern Europe the Ukrainians are people whose native language is Ukrainian (an objective criterion) whether or not they are nationally conscious, and all those who identify themselves as Ukrainian (a subjective criterion) whether or not they speak Ukrainian.

Attempts to introduce a territorial-political concept of Ukrainian nationality on the Western European model (presented by political philosopher Vyacheslav Lypynsky) were unsuccessful until the 1990s. Territorial loyalty has also been manifested by the historical national minorities living in Ukraine. The official declaration of Ukrainian sovereignty of 16 July 1990 stated that "citizens of the Republic of all nationalities constitute the people of Ukraine."

Culture

Due to Ukraine's geographical location, its culture primarily exhibits Eastern European influence as well as Central European to an extent (primarily in the western region). Over the years it has been influenced by movements such as those brought about during the Byzantine Empire and the Renaissance. Today, the country is somewhat culturally divided with the western regions bearing a stronger Central European influence and the eastern regions showing a significant Russian influence. A strong Christian culture was predominant for many centuries, although Ukraine was also the center of conflict between the Catholic, Orthodox and Islamic spheres of influence.

Languages

Ukrainian (ukraі́nska móva) is a language of the East Slavic subgroup of the Slavic languages. It is the only official state language of Ukraine. Written Ukrainian uses the Ukrainian alphabet, one of many based on the Cyrillic alphabet.

The Ukrainian language traces its origins to the Old East Slavic language of the medieval state of Kyivan Rus. In its earlier stages it was called Ruthenian in Latin. Ukrainian, along with all other East Slavic languages, is a lineal descendant of the colloquial language used in Kyivan Rus (10th–13th century).

While the Golden Horde placed officials in key Kyivan Rus areas, practised forced resettlement, and even renamed urban centers to suit their own language, the Mongols did not attempt to annihilate Kyivan Rus society and culture. The second onslaught began with the destruction of Kyiv by the Golden Horde in 1240. This khanate formed the western part of a great Mongol Empire that had been founded by Genghis Khan in the early 13th century.  After the Mongol destruction of Kyivan Rus in the 13th century, literary activity in Ukraine declined. A revival began in the late 18th century in eastern Ukraine with overlapping literary and academic phases at a time when nostalgia for the Cossack past and resentment at the loss of autonomy still lingered on.

The language has persisted despite several periods of bans and/or discouragement throughout centuries as it has always nevertheless maintained a sufficient base among the people of Ukraine, its folklore songs, itinerant musicians, and prominent authors.

A large portion of citizens of Ukraine speaks Russian. According to the 2001 Ukrainian census, 67.5% of Ukrainians (citizens of Ukraine) and 85.2% of ethnic Ukrainians named Ukrainian as their mother-tongue, and 14.8% named Russian as their mother-tongue. This census does not cover Ukrainians living in other countries.

Religions

Ukraine was inhabited by pagan tribes until Byzantine rite Christianity was introduced by the turn of the first millennium. It was imagined by later writers who sought to put Kyivan Christianity on the same level of primacy as Byzantine Christianity that Apostle Andrew himself had visited the site where the city of Kyiv would be later built.

However, it was only by the 10th century that the emerging state, the Kyivan Rus, became influenced by the Byzantine Empire; the first known conversion was by the Princess Saint Olga who came to Constantinople in 945 or 957. Several years later, her grandson, Prince Vladimir baptised his people in the Dnieper River. This began a long history of the dominance of the Eastern Orthodoxy in Ruthenia (Ukraine).

Ukrainians are predominantly Eastern Orthodox Christians, and they form the second largest ethno-linguistic group among Eastern Orthodox in the world. Ukrainians have their own autocephalous Orthodox Church of Ukraine headed by Metropolitan Epiphanius and in the eastern and southern areas of Ukraine the Ukrainian Orthodox Church under the jurisdiction of the Moscow Patriarchate is the most common.

In the Western region known as Halychyna, the Ukrainian Greek Catholic Church, one of the Eastern Rite Catholic Churches has a strong membership. Since the fall of the Soviet Union there has been a growth of Protestant churches and Rodnovery, a contemporary Slavic modern pagan religion. There are also ethnic minorities that practice other religions, i.e. Crimean Tatars (Islam), and Jews and Karaim (Judaism).

A 2020 survey conducted by the Razumkov Centre found that majority of Ukrainian populations was adhering to Christianity (81.9%). Of these Christians, 75.4% are Eastern Orthodox (34% of the Orthodox Church of Ukraine and 13.8% of the Moscow Patriarchate, and 27.6% are simply Orthodox), 8.2% are Greek Catholics, 7.1% are simply Christians, a further 1.9% are Protestants and 0.4% are Latin Catholics. As of 2016, 16.3% of the population does not claim a religious affiliation, and 1.7% adheres to other religions. According to the same survey, 70% of the population of Ukraine declared to be believers,  but do not belong to any church. 8.8% do not identify themselves with any of the denominations, and another 5.6% identified themselves as non-believers.

Music

Ukrainian music incorporates a diversity of external cultural influences. It also has a very strong indigenous Slavic and Christian uniqueness whose elements were used among many neighboring nations.

Ukrainian folk oral literature, poetry, and songs (such as the dumas) are among the most distinctive ethnocultural features of Ukrainians as a people. Religious music existed in Ukraine before the official adoption of Christianity, in the form of plainsong "obychnyi spiv" or "musica practica". Traditional Ukrainian music is easily recognized by its somewhat melancholy tone. It first became known outside of Ukraine during the 15th century as musicians from Ukraine would perform before the royal courts in Poland (latter in Russia).

A large number of famous musicians around the world was educated or born in Ukraine, among them are famous names like Dmitry Bortniansky, Sergei Prokofiev, Myroslav Skoryk, etc. Ukraine is also the rarely acknowledged musical heartland of the former Russian Empire, home to its first professional music academy, which opened in the mid-18th century and produced numerous early musicians and composers.

Dance

Ukrainian dance refers to the traditional folk dances of the peoples of Ukraine. Today, Ukrainian dance is primarily represented by what ethnographers, folklorists and dance historians refer to as "Ukrainian Folk-Stage Dances", which are stylized representations of traditional dances and their characteristic movements that have been choreographed for concert dance performances. This stylized art form has so permeated the culture of Ukraine, that very few purely traditional forms of Ukrainian dance remain today.

Ukrainian dance is often described as energetic, fast-paced, and entertaining, and along with traditional Easter eggs (pysanky), it is a characteristic example of Ukrainian culture recognized and appreciated throughout the world.

Symbols

Ukraine's national symbols include its flag and its coat of arms.

The national flag of Ukraine is a blue and yellow bicolour rectangle. The colour fields are of same form and equal size. The colours of the flag represent a blue sky above yellow fields of wheat. The flag was designed for the convention of the Supreme Ruthenian Council, meeting in Lviv in October 1848. Its colours were based on the coat-of-arms of the Kingdom of Ruthenia.

The Coat of arms of Ukraine features the same colours found on the Ukrainian flag: a blue shield with yellow trident—the symbol of ancient East Slavic tribes that once lived in Ukraine, later adopted by Ruthenian and Kievan Rus rulers.

Historiography
Academic journals

See also

 Demographics of Ukraine
 List of Ukrainian rulers
 List of Ukrainians
 Soviet population transfers
 Ukrainian dialects

Footnotes

References

Citations

Sources

Further reading
 
 Vasyl Balushok, "How Rusyns Became Ukrainians", Zerkalo Nedeli (the Mirror Weekly), July 2005. Available in Russian and in Ukrainian.
 Vasyl Balushok, "When was the Ukrainian nation born?", Zerkalo Nedeli (the Mirror Weekly), 23 April – 6 May 2005. Available in Russian and in Ukrainian.
 Dmytro Kyianskyi, "We are more "Russian" then they are: history without myths and sensationalism", Zerkalo Nedeli (the Mirror Weekly), 27 January – 2 February 2001. Available in Russian and in Ukrainian.
 Oleg Chirkov, "External migration – the main reason for the presence of a non-Ukrainian ethnic population in contemporary Ukraine". Zerkalo Nedeli (the Mirror Weekly), 26 January – 1 February 2002. Available in Russian and in Ukrainian.
 Halyna Lozko, "Ukrainian ethnology. Ethnographic division of Ukraine" Available in Ukrainian.

External links

 Ukrainian World Congress.
 Ukrainian diaspora in Canada and the U.S. 
 Ukrainians at Encyclopedia of Ukraine
 Races of Europe 1942–1943
 Hammond's Racial map of Europe, 1919 "National Alumni" 1920, vol.7
 Peoples of Europe / Die Voelker Europas 1914 
 Ethno-Linguistic Map of Europe Before 1914
 Linguistic Divisions of Europe in 1914 
 Ethnic Territory of the Ukrainian people in the Late Nineteenth and Early Twentieth Centuries

 
Ethnic groups in Azerbaijan
Ethnic groups in Crimea
Ethnic groups in Kazakhstan
Ethnic groups in Kyrgyzstan
Ethnic groups in Poland
Ethnic groups in Russia
Ethnic groups in Ukraine
Slavic ethnic groups
Ukrainian studies
Indigenous peoples of Ukraine
Ethnic groups divided by international borders